Kallar Dam (Malayalam : കല്ലാർ അണക്കെട്ട്)  is a small diversion dam constructed at Perinchankuttyar in Nedunkandam grama Panchayat, Idukki District, Kerala, India.  It acts mainly as a diversion dam to supply water to the Idukki Dam. It is a small dam measuring 67.91 m in length and 12.19 m in height. The water stored in the Kallar Dam reaches the Erattayar River through a tunnel and the Erattayar Dam through the Erattayar River. Water reaches Idukki Dam from Irattayar Dam through Irattayar Tunnel and Anchuruli Tunnel. Taluks through which release flow are Thodupuzha, Udupanchola, Devikulam, Kothamangalam, Muvattupuzha, Kunnathunadu, Aluva, Kodungalloor and Paravur . 
 Reservoir area of this dam and the Gavi dam combined is 25 hectares.

Specifications
Latitude : 9⁰ 49′ 30 ” N
Longitude: 77⁰ 09′ 20” E
Panchayath : Nedumkandam  
Village : Kalkoonthal
District : Idukki
River Basin : Periyar
River : Perinjamkutty ( Tributary of Periyar)
Release from Dam to river : Periyar

Type of Dam : Concrete- Gravity
 Classification : LH ( Low height)
 Maximum Water Level (MWL) : 824.48 meters
 Full Reservoir Level ( FRL) : 824.48 meters
 Storage at FRL : 0.793 Mm3
 Height from deepest foundation : 12.19 m
 Length : 57.91 m
 Spillway : Ogee type – 4 Nos. Radial gates, each of size 7.62 x 6.10 m
 Year of completion : 1975
Crest Level : 818.38 m
 Name of Project : Idukki HEP
 River Outlet : No outlet
 Type of Project : Hydro Power

References

Dams in Kerala